Marc Agosta (born 7 May 1948) is a Luxembourgian long-distance runner. He competed in the marathon at the 1984 Summer Olympics.

References

External links

1948 births
Living people
Athletes (track and field) at the 1984 Summer Olympics
Luxembourgian male long-distance runners
Luxembourgian male marathon runners
Olympic athletes of Luxembourg